Acianthera chamelopoda is a species of orchid plant native to Colombia.

References 

chamelopoda
Flora of Colombia